Taormina Film Fest (TFF) is a film festival that began in 1955 under the name Rassegna Cinematografica Internazionale di Messina e Taormina. The exhibition, which moved permanently to Taormina in 1971, has hosted over the years many stars of international cinema: Elizabeth Taylor, Marlene Dietrich, Sophia Loren, Cary Grant, Robert De Niro, Colin Firth, Marlon Brando, Charlton Heston, Audrey Hepburn, Gregory Peck, Tom Cruise, Melanie Griffith and Antonio Banderas, among others. The award is the Nastro d'Argento in Italian cinema (Silver Ribbon).

History
From 1957 to 1980 there was the award ceremony of David di Donatello, named after Donatello's David, a movie award assigned each year for cinematic performances and production by Ente David di Donatello, part of Accademia del Cinema Italiano. It is the Italian equivalent to the Academy Award. The aim was to honour the best of each year’s Italian and foreign films, similar to the American Oscars. However, the Davids have been and are awarded by the people in the industry: screenwriters, performers, technicians, producers and so on. The ceremonies were held at the Greek Theatre in Taormina. During the years the ceremony was held in Taormina, it was organized by journalist and film producer Michael Stern who later went on to found The Michael Stern Parkinson's Research Foundation in New York City.

The festival was directed from 1999 to 2006 by Felice Laudadio, who has brought to Sicily major names in world cinema. The 2004  festival was its fiftieth anniversary.

From  2007, the director is Deborah Young, for many years the vice-director under Laudadio. The event has hosted, for several years, the award ceremony for the Nastro d'Argento in Italian cinema, a competition in which many international films preview. It takes place in the city's Greek Theater. Enrico Ghezzi, director from 1991 to 1998, renamed the show TaoFest.

Art directors 
 Arturo Arena (1955)
 Michele Ballo (1956 - 1968)
 Giuseppe Campione (1969 - 1970)
 Gian Luigi Rondi (1971 - 1980)
 Guglielmo Biraghi (1981 - 1990)
 Enrico Ghezzi (1991-1998) 
 Felice Laudadio (1999-2006) 
 Deborah Young (2007-2011)
 Mario Sesti (2012-2016)
 Felice Laudadio (2017)
 Gianvito Casadonte e Silvia Bizio (2018-2019)
 Leo Gullotta e Francesco Calogero (2020)

Past recipients

Honors

Actors
Marlon Brando
Jack Nicholson
Liam Neeson
Richard Burton
Al Pacino
Tom Cruise
Robert Redford
Michael Douglas
Sean Connery
Dustin Hoffman
Warren Beatty
Robert Duvall
Cary Grant
Henry Fonda
Peter O'Toole
Laurence Olivier
Jack Lemmon
Walter Matthau
Marcello Mastroianni
Rex Harrison
Charlton Heston
Rod Steiger
Antonio Banderas
Gary Cooper
Willem Dafoe
Yves Montand
Jean-Louis Trintignant
Matt Dillon
Alain Delon
Vittorio Gassman
Giancarlo Giannini
Fred Astaire
Philippe Noiret
Olivia Hussey (1969)
Jennifer Jones (1975)
Deborah Kerr (1959)

Directors and producers
Francis Ford Coppola
Martin Scorsese
David Lean
Peter Weir
Pedro Almodóvar
Steven Spielberg
Miloš Forman
Akira Kurosawa
Stephen Frears
Roman Polanski
Sydney Pollack
Paul Schrader
Joel Schumacher
Ingmar Bergman
John Schlesinger
Jane Campion
Robert Altman
Michelangelo Antonioni
Bob Fosse
John Huston
Norman Jewison
Stanley Kramer
Vittorio De Sica
Federico Fellini
Robert Bresson
Richard Brooks
Milena Canonero
Sofia Coppola
Sergio Leone
Joseph Losey
Gillo Pontecorvo
Andrej Tarkovskij
Hugh Hudson
Giuseppe Tornatore
Krzysztof Zanussi
Franco Zeffirelli
Luchino Visconti
Billy Wilder
Mike Leigh

Awards

David di Donatello
Charles Laughton (1958) 
Martin Bregman (1976)
Dino De Laurentiis (1957, 1961, 1965, 1966, 1968)
Isabelle Adjani (1975, 1976)
Julie Andrews (1966)
Brigitte Bardot (1961)
Ingrid Bergman (1957)
Claudia Cardinale (1961, 1968, 1972)
Julie Christie (1967)
Faye Dunaway (1968)
Susan Hayward (1959)
Audrey Hepburn (1960, 1962, 1965)
Sophia Loren (1961, 1964, 1965, 1970, 1974)
Melina Mercouri (1965)
Mia Farrow (1969)
Marilyn Monroe (1958)
Lana Turner (1966)
Barbra Streisand (1969, 1974)
Elizabeth Taylor (1960, 1967, 1972)
Liv Ullmann (1974)
Lino Ventura (1974)
Jodie Foster (1977)
Goldie Hawn (1970) 
Maria Schneider (1973)
Shelley Winters (1977)
Stanley Kubrick (1969, 1977)
John Schlesinger (1970, 1972, 1980)
Martin Scorsese (1977)
Tatum O'Neal (1974)
Geraldine Page (1963)
Carlo Ponti (1964, 1965, 1967)
Jay Presson Allen (1980)
Vanessa Redgrave (1972)
Franco Rossi (1961)
Nino Rota (1977)
Albert S. Ruddy (1973)
Sam Spiegel (1958, 1964)
Ray Stark (1980)
Darryl F. Zanuck (1963)
Jack L. Warner (1957, 1965)

Taormina Arte Award
Melanie Griffith (2000) 
Jennifer Jason Leigh (2001)
Hugh Grant (2002)	
Isabelle Huppert (1980, 2002)
Judi Dench (2004)
Gina Lollobrigida (1963, 1969, 2001)
Miriam Makeba (2001)
Greta Scacchi (2002)
Hanna Schygulla (1980, 2007)
Mira Sorvino (2004)
Joel Schumacher (2003)
Margarethe von Trotta (2004)
Irene Papas (2005)
Charlotte Rampling (2005) 
André Téchiné (2007)
Paul Schrader (2008) 
Catherine Deneuve (2009)
Colin Firth (2010)
Monica Bellucci (2011)
Sophia Loren (2012)
Terry Gilliam (2012)
Russell Crowe (2013)
Meg Ryan (2013)
Claudia Cardinale (2014)
Paz Vega (2014)
Asia Argento (2015)
Rupert Everett (2015)
Richard Gere (2015)
Miguel Bosè (2016)

Nastro d'argento
Steven Spielberg (1999)
Dante Spinotti (2000)
Vittorio Storaro (1999) 
Ennio Morricone (1999, 2000, 2001, 2007)

See also
Ancient theatre of Taormina
Nastro d'Argento

References

External links 
 
 

Film festivals in Italy
Taormina
Tourist attractions in Sicily
1955 establishments in Italy
Film festivals established in 1955